Thomas Montagu, 4th Earl of Salisbury, KG (13 June 13883 November 1428) of Bisham in Berkshire, was an English nobleman and one of the most important English commanders during the Hundred Years' War.

Origins

He was the eldest son of John Montagu, 3rd Earl of Salisbury (died 1400), who was killed while plotting against King Henry IV in 1400, and his lands forfeited. The lands were partly retrieved by Thomas in 1409, and fully in 1421. His mother was Maud Francis, daughter of Sir Adam Francis (born c. 1334), Mayor of London.

Career
Thomas was summoned to Parliament as Earl of Salisbury in 1409, although he was not formally invested as earl until 1421. In 1414, he was made a Knight of the Garter. In July 1415, he was one of the seven peers who tried Richard, Earl of Cambridge on charges of conspiring against King Henry V. Montagu then joined King Henry V in France, where he fought at the siege of Harfleur and at the Battle of Agincourt. Montagu fought in various other campaigns in France in the following years. In 1419 he held an independent command, and was appointed lieutenant-general of Normandy and created Count of Perche, as part of Henry V's policy of creating Norman titles for his followers.

Although he was employed on some diplomatic missions, he took almost no part in politics and spent most of the rest of his life as a soldier in France, leading troops in the various skirmishes and sieges that were central to that part of the Hundred Years' War. In 1423, he was appointed governor of Champagne, and in 1425, he captured the city of Le Mans. After a year in England, he returned to a position of command in 1428, and fought at the siege of Orléans, at which he lost his life on 3 November of that year.

Marriages and children
He married twice:
 Firstly to Eleanor Holland, a sister and eventual co-heiress of Edmund Holland, 4th Earl of Kent, and daughter of Thomas Holland, 2nd Earl of Kent. By Eleanor he had a daughter, his only legitimate child: Alice Montagu, who married Richard Neville, who later succeeded his father-in-law jure uxoris as Earl of Salisbury.
 Secondly to Alice Chaucer, daughter of Thomas Chaucer and granddaughter of the poet Geoffrey Chaucer.

Siblings

Richard Montacute,

Thomas Montacute, 4th Earl of Salisbury

Lady Anne Montacute who married Sir Richard II Hankford as his second wife, then Sir Lewis Johan as his second wife and thirdly John Holland, 2nd Duke of Exeter as his third wife. Lady Anne was the mother of Anne Hankford by her first marriage.

Lady Margaret Montacute

Lady Elizabeth Montacute

Sir Alan Buxhull II, Half Brother

Illegitimate son
He had an illegitimate son John (or James) Montagu/Montacute, to whom he bequeathed his manor of Luddesdown in Kent. It is suggested in Collins Peerage that he was the ancestor of the family of Montagu of Boughton House, Northamptonshire (which uses the coat of arms and quarterings of the Montagu Earls of Salisbury, but differenced by a bordure sable), which includes Montagu, Duke of Montagu; Montagu, Earl of Manchester; Montagu, Earl of Sandwich, etc., whose earliest proven ancestor was Thomas Montagu (d.1516) of Hemington, Northamptonshire, the grandfather of Sir Edward Montagu (1530-1602), Lord Chief Justice, who purchased Boughton.

Death

On 27 October 1428, he was wounded during the siege of Orléans, when the tower he was inside was hit by a cannonball. There are conflicting reports on the manner in which this wounded him; Enguerrand de Monstrelet states a piece of stone from the window 'carried away part of his face'. He died days later at Meung-sur-Loire on 3 November 1428.

References

External links
 Hundred Years War: Thomas Montacute, 4th Earl of Salisbury (1388–1428)
 Royal Berkshire History: Thomas Montacute, Earl of Salisbury (1388–1428)

1388 births
1428 deaths
14th-century English nobility
15th-century English nobility
Earls of Salisbury (1337 creation)
Counts of Perche
English generals
People of the Hundred Years' War
Knights of the Garter
People from Bisham
Thomas
Barons Monthermer
English military personnel killed in action
Barons Montagu